Ording is a Norwegian surname. Notable people with the surname include:

  Aake Anker Ording, former CEO of Dynamit Nobel
 Arne Ording, Norwegian historian
 Bjart Ording, Norwegian horse rider
 Fredrik Ording, Norwegian educator
 Hans Ording, Norwegian theologian
 Johannes Ording, Norwegian theologian
 Jørn Ording, Norwegian actor
 Peter Ording, German rower